Haliangium is a genus of bacteria from the family of Kofleriaceae. Haliangium bacteria produce the antifungal compounds haliangicins.

References

Further reading 
 
 

 

Myxococcota
Bacteria genera